17th Party Congress may refer to:
 The 17th National Congress of the Communist Party of China, Beijing 2007.
 The 17th Congress of the All-Union Communist Party, Soviet Union 1934.